Won at Last is a five-act comedy by American dramatist Steele MacKaye.  The play was written and set in 1877.

Cast
John Fleming, a man of the world
Professor Tracy, a man of science
Will Tracy, his son, a young sea-captain
Dr. Sterling, a man of fact
Major Bunker, a confiding husband
Baron von Spiegel, one who knows
Captain Maudle
A Sailor
Mr. Toddypop
Mr. Mockem
Mr. Tenderhug
Robert, Fleming's Valet
Grace Fleming, a true woman
Mrs. Tracy, the professor's wife
Sophy Bunker, a French adventuress
Flora Fitzgiggle, a faded flower
Mrs. Jones
Mrs. Smith
Polly Fickle
Becky Stingall
Miss Lovewild
Jane McCarthy, a servant
Lane, a servant

External links
Won At Last at pdc1.org

Comedy plays
1877 plays
Plays by Steele MacKaye
Fiction set in 1877
New England in fiction
Plays set in the United States